Bellegarde-en-Marche (literally Bellegarde in Marche; Auvergnat: Belagarda) is a commune in the Creuse department in the Nouvelle-Aquitaine region in central France.

History 
Bellegarde is a bastide (fortified village) created in the 13th century, during the defence of the Limousin against the English who then disputed territory in Western metropolitan France (Guyenne). King Louis VIII, fighting against Henry III, the English king, decided to establish a forward military post in Bellegarde. It took its current name in 1892.

 It is the former capital of the Franc-alleu, a medieval free-trade zone at a crossroads between two powerful regions: Auvergne and Limousin.
 In the wake of Aubusson and Felletin, tapestry workshops were set up in the city during and after the Renaissance. Bellegarde was even considered for a time a "rival" of Aubusson and Felletin in this activity.

Geography

Population

Sights
 The church, dating from the nineteenth century.
 A sixteenth-century tower.
 Some very old houses.
 Remains of a feudal castle.
 The chapel of Notre-Dame, dating from the nineteenth century.
 Tour Jacqueron, a defensive tower marking the East end of the old Bastide.

Notable people
 François Goubert (1735–1815), was a clergyman and a politician. Prefect of Aubusson in 1762, he became parish priest in Bellegarde in 1788 and official of Chénérailles. He was elected deputy of the Creuse clergy in 1789.
 François Denhaut (1877–1952), an early French aviator & engineer who invented and tested a type of flying boat, died here.
 Lionel de Marmier (1897–1944), born in Bellegarde-en-Marche, pilot of the French Air Force and resistance fighter, a figure of free France.

International relations

Bellegarde-en-Marche is twinned with:
 Chamblon, Switzerland

See also
Communes of the Creuse department

References

Communes of Creuse